Unloving U is a Philippine romance comedy television miniseries starring Loisa Andalio and Ronnie Alonte, directed by Easy Ferrer. The series premiered on iWantTFC on February 8, 2021 to February 13, 2021.

Plot
Fiona’s true feelings towards her stepbrother Alfie is her most guarded secret. Her love remains undeclared even after their parents separated. Meeting again after three years, she discovers that her feelings towards him never waned and are stronger than ever. However, it gets more complicated with their feuding parents, a girlfriend, and band problems that are getting into the mix of emotions that is about to explode into a sweet symphony of love.

Cast and characters 

 Loisa Andalio as Fiona Acosta
 Ronnie Alonte as Alfie Almeida
 Gelli de Belen as Darlene Almeida
 Ariel Rivera as Henry Acosta
 KD Estrada as Jam
 Anji Salvacion as Waltz
 Sam Cruz as Jacklyn
 Ayeesha Cervantes as Lily
Miko Gallardo as Juan
Kate Yalung as Betty
Ron Angeles as Mack
Ji-An Lachica as Salve

Episodes

Official soundtrack

Production and release 
The production is in lock-in taping due to the pandemic. The series was announced on the official YouTube channel of ABS-CBN.

Broadcast

The show had its Philippine TV Premiere from September 18 to October 23, 2021 on Yes Weekend Saturday primetime on Kapamilya Channel, Kapamilya Online Live and A2Z replacing the first season of Hoy, Love You! and was replaced by Come and Hug Me.

See also 
 List of iWant TFC original programming

References

External links 
 
 Unloving U on iWantTFC

2021 Philippine television series debuts
ABS-CBN drama series
Filipino-language television shows
IWantTFC original programming